Extreme Dinosaurs is an American animated series produced by DIC Productions, L.P. and Bohbot Entertainment in 1997 based on a 1996 toy line from Mattel. This show is a spin-off of Street Sharks (where they first appeared as the Dino Vengers).

The show is in the same vein as Teenage Mutant Ninja Turtles and Jurassic Park. Extreme Dinosaurs was broadcast in syndication as part of Bohbot Entertainment's Bohbot Kids Network block where it aired for one season in 1997.

Plot
The series starred a Tyrannosaurus, a Triceratops, a Stegosaurus, and a Pteranodon that were transformed into super warriors by an interdimensional criminal named Argor Zardok. They rebelled against the alien criminal and battle with Argor's second group of warriors known as the evil Raptors. Eventually, the Raptors' objective is to cause global warming by increasing the Earth's temperature, which will make life on earth more comfortable for dinosaurs.

Characters

Extreme Dinosaurs
 T-Bone (voiced by Scott McNeil) – a Tyrannosaurus and the team's leader who is usually attentive to the primary objective even where the others are distracted. His signature move is that he can perform alone or with any in the group, is the "Saurian Stomp" which shakes the local ground. T-Bone is light yellow and wears black boots (wherein one of his claws protrudes through the right boot), dark green pants, and shoulder pads.
 Spike (voiced by Cusse Mankuma) – a Triceratops with one broken horn who is the Extreme Dinosaurs' martial arts expert and the residential chef. Despite his eagerness to fight, he tends a garden in his free time. Spike is iceberg blue with a dark purple under his tail and wears brown shorts, brown leg bands, a yellow belt, and is always barefoot.
 Stegz (voiced by Sam Vincent) – a Stegosaurus who is the team's technological specialist and the most contemplative of the four. He can curl his body into a destructive saw blade, using the plates on his back as its cutting edge. Stegz is apple green and wears purple shorts and black boots.
 Bullzeye (voiced by Jason Gray-Stanford) – a wise-cracking Pteranodon whose chief weapon is a shriek of ear-splitting frequency. Bullzeye is lazy and given to impulse buying. Bullzeye is maroon red and wears yellow pants, black shoes (which his claws protrude through), and a gold necklace.
 Hard Rock (voiced by Blu Mankuma) – an Ankylosaurus from an alternate reality inhabited by humanoid dinosaurs. After helping them against the Raptors, Hard Rock joined the Extreme Dinosaurs. He is the principal pacifist. Hard Rock is tan and wears red pants with grey boots.

Raptors
The Velociraptors (or Raptors) are the archenemies of the Extreme Dinosaurs with the determination of conquering Earth or changing its climate by global warming to fit their comfort.

 Bad Rap (voiced by Garry Chalk) – the leader of the Raptors. He is orange with yellow stripe tail and a metal brace-like device attached to his mouth. He briefly had a weapon on one hand that dissolved solid matter effortlessly. This is later replaced by a rocket-launcher. Bad Rap wears a yellow strap over his torso and waist and black shorts. His goal is to permanently alter the Earth's biosphere to closely resemble the Mesozoic. In "The Dinosaur Prophecy", Bad Rap briefly developed a super-powered alter ego named Abysmal Rap. As Abysmal Rap, he is the most powerful villain in the show. 
 Haxx (voiced by Lee Tockar) – a mahogany Raptor with implants on the backs of each wrist that produce green blades. His tail has been replaced with a blade that is capable of spinning like a drill. Haxx is the most-gifted among of all of the main characters with his abilities, but he is set back by his low intelligence. He wears pink shorts.
 Spittor (voiced by Terry Klassen) – the brains of the Raptors. He is mulberry-purple with white on his neck, chest and feet. Spittor wears no clothing and carries a tank of various liquids released from nozzles on his hands, tail, and mouth.
 Cyber-Raptors – robot versions of Raptors built by Spittor to use as foot soldiers against the Extreme Dinosaurs. They first appeared in the episode "Cyber Raptors".

Quadrainians
The Quadrainians are a race of blue-skinned humanoids from the largely-unseen Quadrainia.

 Argor Zardok (voiced by Terry Klassen) – Argor Zardok is a wanted criminal from Quadrainia who arrives on Earth in the Mesozoic and transforms most of the principal characters into his personal soldiers. He ended up causing the K-T Event by equipping Bad Rap with a supremely-powerful weapon.
 Chedra Bodzak (voiced by Louise Vallance) – a female law officer stranded on Earth alongside the Extreme Dinosaurs and distinguished by constant reference to a 'Codebook' containing the laws of her society. She serves as a mentor to the Dinosaurs and as a comic foil when they transgress her book's edicts.

Other villains
 Queen Zarconda (voiced by Kathleen Barr) – the queen of an alien world in "Colloso-Dome" who kidnaps T-Bone, Spike, and Stegz to satisfy her amusement.
 Gort (voiced by Terry Klassen) – Queen Zarconda's right-hand man.
 Dr. Rebecca Scarwell (voiced by Marcy Goldberg) – a secretive scientist researching mutations and extraterrestrials, who captures the Extreme Dinosaurs more than once.
 Peter Benning (voiced by Sam Vincent) – a paleontologist determined to capture the Extreme Dinosaurs and Raptors for fame and glory.
 Count Alexander von Skullheim  (voiced by David Sobolov) – a nefarious criminal who appears in "Agent Double-'O' Dinosaur".
 General Amadi (voiced by Alec Willows) – an unbalanced general who appears in "Raptorian Crude".
 John Rathbone – a hunter who appears in "Safari-Saurus".
 Dr. Monstromo – an evil doctor who appears in "The Mysterious Island of Dr. Monstromo".

Allies
 Porcupine Duvall (voiced by Garry Chalk) – a paleontologist and owner of a private Dinosaur Museum which the Extreme Dinosaurs inhabit as their lair.
 Prince H (voiced by Jacques Bourassa) – the Prince of England who sometimes helps the Extreme Dinosaurs with some missions.
 Ridge (voiced by Scott McNeil) – a dinosaur of unknown species (possibly Dilophosaurus) who fights as champion in an intergalactic fighting arena.
 The Skelesaurs - a group of four dinosaur skeletons of the team's species. They appear in the episode "Bones of Contention". At first, they are against the Extreme Dinosaurs. Then after merging into Megasaur, they become allies of the team.

Other characters
 Nigel Moorehead (voiced by Garry Chalk)
 Dylan (voiced by Andrew Francis)
 Ditto – Stegz's pet ostrich, hatched from an egg, which Badrap mistook for a Velociraptor egg. He appears in three episodes.
 Dr. Morales (voiced by Lee Tockar) – a scientist who appears in the episode "Raptoroid".

Episodes

Development
The show was originally named Dangerous Dinosaurs when the series was first announced by Bohbot in December 1996. Karen Lee Brown of Bohbot deemed the series as being a cartoon that doesn't rely on weapons but having "enough action to intrigue kids". The show was originally planned as a weekly series.

Merchandise
On August 1, 1997, Bohbot signed deals with over 22 companies for merchandising, including Mattel (Toys), Hallmark (Cards), Fruit of the Loom (Underwear) and Anchor Bay Entertainment (Home Video), although the toys launched prior to the show's launch in April. The launch was also promoted with a 'View & Win' promotion, where action figures and other licensed products were offered as prizes.

In October 1997, Bohbot signed a deal with Creative Mills and H.H. Cutler Company for clothing, including sets, coordinates and T-shirts.

In January 1998, Bohbot's international division BKN International signed UK and Australian home video deals with Carlton Video and Village Roadshow respectively.

Home Video
In October 1997, Anchor Bay Entertainment released two VHS releases of the series - "Out of Time" and "Ick-Thysaurus Vacation", each containing two episodes. Two promotional tapes containing the episodes "Raptoroid" and "Bullzeye Surfs the Web" were also released, exclusively at Blockbuster stores.

In the UK, Carlton Home Entertainment released the series on many VHS volumes. "Out of Time" and "Ick-Thysaurus Vacation" were double-cassette releases each including the bonus episode on the standalone tape, while other releases included "Lunartoons", "Raptoroid", "Jurassic Art", "Cyber-Raptors", which had three episodes on one VHS.

Roadshow Entertainment released the series on VHS in Australia on the VHS volumes: "Ick-Thysaurus Vacation" and "Dinosaur Warriors". In 2006, Force Entertainment released the complete series over four single-disc DVD volumes. Each DVD volume included a single opening and closing sequence, with 13 episodes in production order.
 	
Pidax Film released the first 13 episodes on DVD in Germany, with English and German audio, on April 6, 2018, under license from Your Family Entertainment AG. This was followed up with three more volumes, released on June 22, August 31, and October 26, respectively, all together making up the complete series.

Future
Since the show ended in late 1997, the show has been made available on many streaming platforms such as Amazon Prime and Apple TV among other platforms.

In 2021, "Bad Rap Rising", a live-action fan movie based on the series and using animatronics was released on small streaming platforms. It has no official connection to the series as the series is now owned by 41 Entertainment.

Toy line
Extreme Dinosaurs was a series of toys created by Mattel in 1996. It later spawned a TV series in 1997 with the same name. Originally called Dino Vengers, these toys are about a group of college teens who turn into dinosaurs (the plot for the toys is a lot different than the plot of the TV series). The main toys are "T-Bone", "Bullzeye", "Spike", "Stegz" and "Hard Rock". The enemies of the toy line are "Bad Rap", "Haxx" and "Spittor". Later on, the toys expanded into "Dino Vision" toys. There were also War Paint and re-colors of the toys. The toys were also a spin-off of Street Sharks, another toy line also by Mattel that was also made into a TV series.

See also
 List of anthropomorphic animal superheroes
 Street Sharks

References

External links
 

Animated television series about dinosaurs
First-run syndicated television programs in the United States
1990s American animated television series
1990s American daily animated television series
1990s toys
1997 American television series debuts
1997 American television series endings
American animated television spin-offs
American children's animated action television series
American children's animated adventure television series
American children's animated science fantasy television series
Animal superheroes
English-language television shows
Television shows based on Mattel toys
Television series by DIC Entertainment